Events from the year 1797 in Scotland.

Incumbents

Law officers 
 Lord Advocate – Robert Dundas of Arniston
 Solicitor General for Scotland – Robert Blair

Judiciary 
 Lord President of the Court of Session – Lord Succoth
 Lord Justice General – The Duke of Montrose
 Lord Justice Clerk – Lord Braxfield

Events 
 19 July – Act to Raise and Embody a Militia Force in Scotland.
 29 August – Massacre of Tranent: British troops attack protestors against enforced recruitment into the militia at Tranent in East Lothian, killing 12.
 11 October (12 October naval reckoning) – Battle of Camperdown: Royal Navy led by Dundee-born Admiral Duncan defeats the fleet of the Batavian Republic off the coast of Holland.
 Cloch lighthouse completed.
 Johnston Press established as printers in Falkirk.
 Johnstons of Elgin established as a textile mill in Elgin, Moray.
 Keiller's marmalade first produced in Dundee.
 Publication of Encyclopædia Britannica Third Edition is completed in Edinburgh.

Births 
 29 April – George Don, botanist (died 1856)
 10 October – Thomas Drummond, military surveyor and Under-Secretary for Ireland (died 1840 in Ireland)
 14 November – Charles Lyell, geologist (died 1875 in England)
 3 December – Andrew Smith, military surgeon, explorer, ethnologist and zoologist (died 1872 in England)

Deaths 
 26 March – James Hutton, geologist (born 1726)
 30 December – David Martin, portrait painter and engraver (born 1737)

The arts
 24 December – Walter Scott marries Charlotte Carpenter at St Mary's Church, Carlisle, and the couple immediately move into their new home at 50 George Street, Edinburgh.

References 

 
Years of the 18th century in Scotland
Scotland
1790s in Scotland